James Marvin Young (December 2, 1843 – November 30, 1913) was an American soldier who fought in the American Civil War. Young received his country's highest award for bravery during combat, the Medal of Honor. Young's medal was won for his heroism in the Battle of the Wilderness during the Overland Campaign in Virginia on May 6, 1864. He was honored with the award on April 2, 1898.

Young was born in Ellicott, New York,  and entered service in Chautauqua County, New York.

After the war, he worked as a policeman in Jamestown for 30 years. He died at his home there on November 30, 1913. He was buried in Lake View Cemetery.

Medal of Honor citation

See also
 List of American Civil War Medal of Honor recipients: T–Z

References

External links
 

1843 births
1913 deaths
American Civil War recipients of the Medal of Honor
People from Jamestown, New York
People of New York (state) in the American Civil War
Union Army soldiers
United States Army Medal of Honor recipients
American municipal police officers